Duon may refer to the following things:

 A DNA codon also serving as part of a transcription factor binding site
 Moel y Cerrig Duon, a summit in north east Wales
 Duon, a boss in the game Super Smash Bros. Brawl